Area code 616 is the telephone area code in the North American Numbering Plan (NANP) for Greater Grand Rapids, Michigan. The numbering plan area also includes the towns of Holland, Greenville, and Grand Haven. This comprises all of Kent and Ottawa counties, and parts of neighboring counties, including the western and central parts of Ionia County. It was one of the original North American area codes created in 1947.

History 
In 1947, the first nationwide telephone numbering plan designated three area codes for the state of Michigan (313, 517, and 616) assigned to divisions of the state into three numbering plan areas (NPAs). 616 was assigned to the western part, with a dividing line running from the far north shore on Lake Huron through the middle of the state south to the Indiana state line. This included the Lower Peninsula and the Upper Peninsula. It was by far the largest of Michigan's three numbering plan areas, covering as much territory as the other two combined. It was also the largest numbering plan area east of the Mississippi River that did not comprise an entire state.

In 1961, the Upper Peninsula was split off with area code 906. This configuration remained in place for 38 years. In 1999, the northwestern Lower Peninsula, including Muskegon, Traverse City and Cadillac, became area code 231. As a result, 616 was now mostly coextensive with the core of West Michigan, though Muskegon was now in 231.

The 1999 split was intended to be a long-term solution for the region. However, within two years, the proliferation of cell phones and pagers brought 616 close to exhaustion. In 2002, the lower third of the old 616 territory, including Kalamazoo and Battle Creek, was split off and assigned area code 269, leaving the present area.

Prior to October 2021, area code 616 had telephone numbers assigned for the central office code 988. In 2020, 988 was designated nationwide as a dialing code for the National Suicide Prevention Lifeline, which created a conflict for exchanges that permit seven-digit dialing. This area code was therefore scheduled to transition to ten-digit dialing by October 24, 2021.

References

External links
NANPA map of Michigan area codes
List of exchanges from AreaCodeDownload.com, 616 Area Code

616
616
West Michigan
Telecommunications-related introductions in 1947